Admiral Miaoulis can refer to:
Andreas Miaoulis (1765 – 24 June 1835), admiral of the Greek fleet during the Greek War of Independence
Andreas Miaoulis (born 1869), Greek vice admiral and politician
Ioannis A. Miaoulis (1850–1913), Greek rear admiral